Limicolaria is a genus of tropical air-breathing land snails, terrestrial pulmonate gastropod mollusks in the family Achatinidae.

Species 
Species within the genus Limacolaria include:
Limicolaria abinsiensis Shackleford and Spence 1916
Limicolaria adansoni Pfeiffer, 1861
Limicolaria aurora Jay, 1839 - Cameroun, Senegal
Limicolaria cailliaudi Pfeiffer
Limicolaria charbonnieri Bourguignat, 1889 - Congo
Limicolaria dimidiata Martens, 1880 - Sudan
Limicolaria distincta Putzeys, 1898 - Congo
Limicolaria flammea Müller, 1774 - Nigeria
Limicolaria flammea festiva von Martens, 1869 - Sierra Leone
Limicolaria flammea spekiana Grandidier, 1881 - Sudan
Limicolaria flammulata Pfeiffer, 1847
Limicolaria kambeul Bruguiere, 1792 - Sudan, Senegal
Limicolaria kambeul turriformis Bruguiere, 1792
Limicolaria martensi Martens - Africa
Limicolaria martensi karagweensis Kobelt, 1913 - Congo
Limicolaria martensi pallidistriga Martens, 1895 - Congo
Limicolaria martensiana E. A. Smith, 1880 - Uganda, Nigeria
Limicolaria martensiana laikipiaensis E. A. Smith, 1913 - Kenya
Limicolaria numidica Reeve - Cameroon
Limicolaria saturata E. A. Smith, 1895 - Kenya, Tanzania
Limicolaria saturata chromatica Pilsbry, 1904 - Congo
Limicolaria smithii Preston, 1906 - Uganda
Limicolaria turriformis von Martens
Limicolaria zebra Pilsbry - Cameroun

References

Achatinidae